Niyabinghi chanting typically includes recitation of the Psalms, but may also include variations of well-known Christian hymns and adopted by Rastafarians. The rhythms of these chants were eventually an influence of popular ska, rocksteady and reggae music.

Niyabinghi chants include:

 "400 Million Blackman"
 "400 Years" (its lyrics influenced Peter Tosh's "400 Years")
 "Babylon In I Way"
 "Babylon Throne Gone Down" (arranged by Bob Marley to "Rastaman Chant" in 1973)
 "Banks of the River"
 "Behold Jah live"
 "Blackman Get Up Stand Up" (its lyrics influenced Bob Marley's and Peter Tosh's "Get Up, Stand Up" in 1973)
 "Brimstone"
 "Chant Zion Chant"
 "Closer Than a Brother"
 "Come sight up in Jah Army"
 "Fool Fool"
 "Have a little light in I"
 "I'n'I Riding"
 "I Am Getting Ready"
 "Idemption Trodding"
 "I Must Trod Home"
 "I Shall Not Remove" (its lyrics influenced Bob Marley's "Forever Loving Jah")
 "I Will Not Go With You"
 "Jah Got the Whole World"
 "Jah Wind Blow East"
 "Leave Babylon"
 "Little Children"
 "Mystery Babylon Have To Move" / "Him Have To Move"
 "Never Get Burn"
 "New Name"
 "No Night in Zion" (arranged and released by Culture in 1997, arranged and released by Luciano in 2001)
 "Nyahbinghi Voyage" (arranged and released by Steel Pulse)
 "One Day Nearer Home"
 "Over Hills and Valleys"
 "Peace and Love"
 "Promise to Hear I Chant"
 "Rastafari Conquer"
 "Rastafari Know What This Gathering For"
 "Rivers of Babylon" (arranged and released by The Jamaicans, Boney M arrangement became a world hit)
 "Rock-of-my Soul"
 "Rock of Ises"
 "Roll River Jordan"
 "Run Come Rally"
 "Satta Massagana"
 "Send One Mighty Ingel"
 "So Long Rastafari" (arranged by Bob Marley in 1978; arranged and released by Dennis Brown in 1979-also check out SO LONG-Count Ossie-1973)
 "Take a Sip"
 "The Lion of Judah" / "The Conquering Lion" (arranged by Bob Marley in 1976)
 "The Things You Do" (arranged and released by Sizzla Kalonji)
 "Universal Tribulation"
 "Volunteer Ithiopian"
 "What a Weeping"
 "What a Woe"
 "Will You Be Ready"
 "Zion Land"

References

Rastafari
Jamaican music

pl:Chanty Nyabinghi